DC15 may refer to :
 OR Tambo District Municipality district code
 Dyson DC15, a 2005 vacuum cleaner by manufacturer Dyson
 15th DEF CON 2007 hackers convention

DC-15 may refer to :
 DC-15 blaster rifle, a fictional weapon used by the Republic clone troopers in Star Wars